Burumbay (Boranbay) is a rural locality (a selo) in Bolshezadoyevsky Selsoviet, Kizlyarsky District, Republic of Dagestan, Russia. The population was 216 as of 2010. There are 2 streets.

Geography 
Burumbay is located 28 km northeast of Kizlyar (the district's administrative centre) by road, on the right bank of the Stary Terk River. Novovladimirskoye and Persidskoye are the nearest rural localities.

Nationalities 
Nogais, Kumyks and Avars live there.

References 

Rural localities in Kizlyarsky District